Minmetals Development Co., Ltd. (MINLIST) is a Shanghai-listed Chinese company principally engaged in the domestic and international trading of minerals. Headquartered in Beijing, the People's Republic of China, the Company mainly offers steel products, steel billets, iron ore, coal and coke.

The Company distributes its products within the domestic markets and to overseas markets. The company is also involved in the international freight forwarding, logistics and storage, international bid and auction, hotel management and high technology industries, through its subsidiaries. As of December 31, 2006, the company had 11 major subsidiaries.

Address 
Minmetals Development Co Ltd
Building B, No. 5 Sanlihe Road
Haidian District
Beijing, BEJ   100044
P: +86 106.849.4267
F: +86 106.849.4207

External links
Company web site
Google Finance profile

Mineral companies of China
Government-owned companies of China
Companies with year of establishment missing